Freddy vs. Jason: The Original Motion Picture Soundtrack is the soundtrack to the 2003 film Freddy vs. Jason. It was released on August 12, 2003, by Roadrunner Records. The album features twenty tracks, fourteen of them previously unreleased by the bands in question.

Track listing

Other songs used in the film
 "Clap Your Hands Pt. 1" – IMx
 "First Time" – IMx
 "Nightmares" – Junkie XL
 "Forward" – Smitty
 "Guru" – Smitty
 "Running" – Smitty
 "Slavery" – Spineshank

Though not present in the film itself, Foo Fighters' "Come Back" is featured during the alternate ending, available on the Blu-ray version but not the DVD.

Personnel 
Producers
 Rob Arnold
 Howard Benson†
 Daniel Bergstrand†
 Dave Chavarri
 Terry Date
 Tom Decker
 Adam Dutkiewicz†
 Bill Gaal
 GGGarth
 Ben Grosse†
 Ross Hogarth†
 Mark Hunter
 Matt Hyde
 James Iha
In Flames
 Joey Jordison
 Bob Marlette
 Mushroomhead
 Bill Kennedy†
 Lamb of God†
 Tim Patalan
 Mike Sarkisyan
 Adam Schlesinger
 Sepultura
 Josh Silver†
 Slipknot
 Pete Steele†
 Stone Sour
 Tom Tatman
 Devin Townsend
 Ulrich Wild†
† Individual provides mixing operations alongside producing.

Mixing
 Jay Baumgardner
 Bobby Brooks
 Anders Fridén
 Orjan Ornkloo
 Colin Richardson
 Christopher Shaw
 Randy Staub
 Shaun Thingvold
 Andy Wallace
 Mike Wallace
 Toby Wright

A&R
 Monte Conner
 Mike Gitter
 Michelle Van Arendonk 

Other personnel
 Micaela Boland – package design
 Paul Broucek – executive in charge of music
 Jessica Dolinger – music clearance
 Ted Jensen – mastering
 George Marino – compilation, mastering
 Boris Elkis – programming
 UE Nastasi – compilation
 Annie Searles – music clearance

Charts

Singles

See also
Friday on Elm Street

References

Friday the 13th (franchise) music
2003 soundtrack albums
A Nightmare on Elm Street (franchise) music
Nu metal albums
Roadrunner Records soundtracks
Roadrunner Records compilation albums
Horror film soundtracks